Empis affinis is a species of fly in the family Empididae. It is included in the subgenus Leptempis. It is found in the Palearctic.

References

Empis
Asilomorph flies of Europe
Insects described in 1860
Taxa named by Johann Egger